Prabodh Panda (7 February 1946 – 27 February 2018) was an Indian politician. He was a leader of the Communist Party of India. He was elected to the 13th Lok Sabha from  Midnapore constituency in West Bengal in a by-election held on 10 May 2001. He was re-elected to the Lok Sabha in 2004 and 2009 from the same constituency.

Personal life

Panda was born in a Utkal Brahmin family. His father was Devendra Nath Panda and mother Niradabala Panda. He graduated in arts from the Dantan Bhattar College, which was then affiliated with the prestigious and historic University of Calcutta. After serving the Lok Sabha office as a Member of Parliament for 13 years, he has been the secretary of state for West Bengal for the Communist Party of India since February 2015. He died on 27 February 2018 following a massive heart attack while working at his office in Kolkata.

References

External links
 Detailed Profile: Shri Prabodh Panda in .gov.in website

1946 births
2018 deaths
Communist Party of India politicians from West Bengal
People from Paschim Medinipur district
India MPs 2004–2009
India MPs 2009–2014
India MPs 1999–2004
University of Calcutta alumni
Lok Sabha members from West Bengal
Communist Party of India candidates in the 2014 Indian general election